The Smells Like Children Tour was the fourth tour Marilyn Manson embarked on, under the management of major record label Interscope Records. The tour was, however, the band's second headlining tour, following the Portrait of an American Family Tour the previous year. The band was on tour from June 1, 1995, until February 4, 1996.

Stage antics
The background for the shows during the Smells Like Children tour was a ouija board which read "Marilyn Manson" on the center. Another feature to the stage was the addition of a giant tree from which hung ventriloquist dummies from the branches. The stage was usually set up to accommodate small audiences, as most of the shows took place in clubs, rather than arenas.

This was the first Tour in which Manson began using stilts. The band also began their signature bizarre looks during this tour as well, by donning makeup and sexually suggestive clothes (with Manson wearing jock straps to pulling his pants down and with Twiggy beginning his traditional kinderwhore cross dressing gimmick).

As in previous tours, Manson was regularly seen cutting himself on stage during this tour. He got his main chest scarring from this tour as he got into a heated argument with a crowd member and he broke a bottle and ran it across his chest.

The Jon Stewart Show appearance

The band appeared on the June 22, 1995 episode of MTV's late-night talk show The Jon Stewart Show with host Jon Stewart. The episode featured a live performance of the songs "Lunchbox" and "Dope Hat" by the band off of their debut album 1994's Portrait of an American Family. The episode sparked nationwide controversy after frontman Marilyn Manson set a Bible ablaze onstage, which elicited public outcry of blasphemy. The band finished their set by throwing instruments around the stage, and ended with a piggyback ride offstage on Jon Stewart. Stewart later recalled the episode in his memoir Angry Optimist: The Life and Times of Jon Stewart, "The next night, Marilyn Manson was on, and they ended up lighting the stage on fire. I really thought somebody was going to be killed that week."

Lineup
Marilyn Manson: Vocals
Daisy Berkowitz: Guitar
Twiggy Ramirez: Bass
Madonna Wayne Gacy: Keyboards
Ginger Fish: Drums

Setlist
The following list contains the most commonly played songs in the order they were most generally performed:

 "Wrapped in Plastic"
 "Snake Eyes and Sissies"
 "Get Your Gunn"
 "Dogma"
 "Cyclops"
 "Cake and Sodomy"
 "Minute Of Decay" (Early version)
 "Down in the Park"
 "Dope Hat"
 "My Monkey"
 "Smells Like Children" (Early version of "Kinderfeld")
 "Irresponsible Hate Anthem" (Early version)
 "Tourniquet" (Early version)
 "Organ Grinder"
 "Lunchbox"
 "Sweet Dreams (Are Made of This)"
 "Rock N Roll Nigger"
 "Misery Machine"

Tour overview
 The performance in Memphis, Tennessee on December 10, 1995, was cancelled for reasons unknown. They returned to Memphis January 26, 1996 to make up the canceled show.
 The performance in Syracuse, New York on January 15 caused a riot with several thousands of dollars' worth of damage to the venue.
 The performance in Johnson City, Tennessee on January 27, 1996, was cancelled due to throat problems with vocalist Marilyn Manson.
 The performance in Knoxville, Tennessee on January 28, 1996, was cancelled for reasons unknown.

Tour dates

References
Notes

Footnotes

External links
Official Marilyn Manson website
Smells Like Children Tour - MansonWiki

Marilyn Manson (band) concert tours
1995 concert tours
1996 concert tours